André Pierre Gabriel Amédée Tardieu (22 September 1876 – 15 September 1945) was three times Prime Minister of France (3 November 1929 – 17 February 1930; 2 March – 4 December 1930; 20 February – 10 May 1932) and a dominant figure of French political life in 1929–1932.  He was a moderate conservative with a strong intellectual reputation, but became a weak prime minister at the start of the worldwide Great Depression.

Biography
Tardieu's paternal grandmother was the composer and pianist Charlotte Tardieu. Andre Tardieu was a graduate of the elite Lycée Condorcet. He was accepted by the even more prestigious École Normale Supérieure, but instead entered the diplomatic service. Later, he left the service and became famous as foreign affairs editor of the newspaper Le Temps. He founded the conservative newspaper L'Echo National in association with Georges Mandel.

In 1914, Tardieu was elected to the Chamber of Deputies from the département of Seine-et-Oise, as a candidate of the center-right Democratic Republican Alliance (Alliance Démocratique – AD). He retained this seat till 1924. From 1926 to 1936, he represented the département of Territoire de Belfort.

When World War I broke out, Tardieu enlisted in the army and served before he was wounded and invalided home in 1916. He then returned to politics. He served as Georges Clemenceau's lieutenant in 1919 during the Paris Peace Conference and as Commissioner for Franco-American War Cooperation. On 8 November 1919, he became Minister of Liberated Regions, administering Alsace and Lorraine, and served until Clemenceau's defeat in 1920.

In 1926, Tardieu returned to government as Minister of Transportation under Raymond Poincaré. In 1928, he moved to Minister of the Interior, continuing under Poincaré's successor Aristide Briand.

In November 1929, Tardieu himself succeeded Briand as Président du Conseil (Prime Minister) and remained Interior Minister. Though generally considered a conservative, he introduced a program of welfare measures, including public works, social insurance, and free secondary schooling, and he encouraged modern techniques in industry. On 11 March 1932, legislation was passed that established universal family allowances for all wage earners in business and industry with at least two children.

He hoped to replace the old ideological standoff between the right and left to a more relevant division based on the modern economy. He argued that "a more dynamic capitalism would dry up the Marxism of the working classes." The goal of his leadership was prosperity. When the Great Depression began in 1929, his goal was to evade a depression in France, which worked for several years. According to Monique Clague, "An obstinate deflationist throughout the thirties Tardieu would clearly not have given France a new deal." In the election of 1932 "he acknowledged the responsibility of the modern state for curing unemployment, but, devoted to the Poincaré franc, he would have sacrificed employment to the maintenance of the gold standard."

Tardieu was displaced from both offices for ten days in February–March 1930 by Radical Camille Chautemps, but he returned until December. He was then Minister of Agriculture in 1931, Minister of War in 1932, and again Prime Minister (this time, also Minister of Foreign Affairs), from 20 February to 3 June 1932, until his coalition was defeated in the May elections.

As Prime Minister, Tardieu served for three (7–10 May 1932) days as the Acting President of the French Republic, between the assassination of Paul Doumer and the election of Albert Lebrun.

He was briefly a Minister of State without portfolio in 1934.

His later political activity was largely concerned with containing and responding to German expansion.

In his two-volume book La Révolution à refaire, Tardieu criticized the French parliamentary system.

Bibliography
Some of his books include:
 La France et les alliances (1908)
 La Paix (1921; published in English as The Truth About the Treaty)
 Devant l'obstacle (1927); published in English as France and America)
 La Révolution à refaire, 2 volumes (1936–37)

Tardieu's First Ministry, 3 November 1929 – 21 February 1930
André Tardieu – President of the Council and Minister of Interior
Aristide Briand – Minister of Foreign Affairs
André Maginot – Minister of War
Henri Chéron – Minister of Finance
Louis Loucheur – Minister of Labour, Hygiene, Welfare Work, and Social Security Provisions
Lucien Hubert – Minister of Justice
Georges Leygues – Minister of Marine
Louis Rollin – Minister of Merchant Marine
Laurent Eynac – Minister of Air
Pierre Marraud – Minister of Public Instruction and Fine Arts
Claudius Gallet – Minister of Pensions
Jean Hennessy – Minister of Agriculture
François Piétri – Minister of Colonies
Georges Pernot – Minister of Public Works
Louis Germain-Martin – Minister of Posts, Telegraphs, and Telephones
Pierre Étienne Flandin – Minister of Commerce and Industry

Tardieu's Second Government, 2 March – 13 December 1930
André Tardieu – President of the Council and Minister of the Interior
Aristide Briand – Minister of Foreign Affairs
André Maginot – Minister of War
Paul Reynaud – Minister of Finance
Louis Germain-Martin – Minister of Budget
Pierre Laval – Minister of Labour and Social Security Provisions
Raoul Péret – Minister of Justice
Jacques-Louis Dumesnil – Minister of Marine
Louis Rollin – Minister of Merchant Marine
Laurent Eynac – Minister of Air
Pierre Marraud – Minister of Public Instruction and Fine Arts
Auguste Champetier de Ribes – Minister of Pensions
Fernand David – Minister of Agriculture
François Piétri – Minister of Colonies
Georges Pernot – Minister of Public Works
Désiré Ferry – Minister of Public Health
André Mallarmé – Minister of Posts, Telegraphs, and Telephones
Pierre Étienne Flandin – Minister of Commerce and Industry

Changes
17 November 1930 – Henri Chéron succeeded Péret as Minister of Justice.

Tardieu's Third Ministry, 20 February – 3 June 1932
André Tardieu – President of the Council and Minister of Foreign Affairs
Paul Reynaud – Vice President of the Council and Minister of Justice
François Piétri – Minister of National Defense
Albert Mahieu – Minister of the Interior
Pierre Étienne Flandin – Minister of Finance
Pierre Laval – Minister of Labour and Social Security Provisions
Charles Guernier – Minister of Public Works and Merchant Marine
Mario Roustan – Minister of Public Instruction and Fine Arts
Auguste Champetier de Ribes – Minister of Pensions and Liberated Regions
Claude Chauveau – Minister of Agriculture
Louis de Chappedelaine – Minister of Colonies
Camille Blaisot – Minister of Public Health
Louis Rollin – Minister of Commerce, Industry, Posts, Telegraphs, and Telephones

See also
 Interwar France

Primary sources
 Tardieu, André. France and the Alliances: The Struggle for the Balance of Power (Macmillan, 1908)  online
 The Truth About The Treaty, written 1921, to defend the French negotiators from claims that they had been too lenient on the Germans.

Further reading
 Binion, Rudolph. Defeated Leaders: The Political Fate of Caillaux, Jouvenel, and Tardieu (1960) pp 197–337 online
  Clague, Monique. 'Vision and Myopia in the New Politics of Andre Tardieu" French Historical Studies 8#1 (1973), pp. 105–129 Online
 Davies, Gareth. "André Tardieu, les Modérés and the Politics of Prosperity: 1929–1932." Histoire@ Politique 1 (2012): 94–110. in English. online

References

External links
  (contains details about the family allowance reform introduced under Tardieu)
 

1876 births
1945 deaths
20th-century heads of state of France
Politicians from Paris
Democratic Republican Alliance politicians
Republican Centre politicians
Prime Ministers of France
Transport ministers of France
French interior ministers
French Ministers of Agriculture
French Ministers of War
Government ministers of France
Members of the 11th Chamber of Deputies of the French Third Republic
Members of the 12th Chamber of Deputies of the French Third Republic
Members of the 13th Chamber of Deputies of the French Third Republic
Members of the 14th Chamber of Deputies of the French Third Republic
Members of the 15th Chamber of Deputies of the French Third Republic
Lycée Condorcet alumni
École Normale Supérieure alumni
Grand Crosses of the Order of the White Lion